"A Little Less Conversation" is a 1968 song recorded by American singer Elvis Presley, written by Mac Davis and Billy Strange and published by Gladys Music, Inc., originally performed in the film Live a Little, Love a Little. The song became a minor hit in the United States when released as a single with "Almost in Love" as the A-side. A 2002 remix by Dutch musician Junkie XL of a later re-recording of the song by Presley became a worldwide hit, topping the singles charts in nine countries and was awarded certifications in ten countries by 2003.

The song has made numerous appearances in popular culture and has been covered by several artists.

Original recordings
"A Little Less Conversation" was first recorded on March 7, 1968, at Western Recorders in Hollywood, California, and released on a single backed by "Almost in Love", another song from the movie. The song was not released on an LP until November 1970, when it was included on the RCA Camden budget label LP Almost in Love. There are several different takes that were made of the song in the session on March 7. The single version used take 16, which was also used for the soundtrack of the film. The version released on the Almost in Love album is take 10, which is 1 second longer in duration.

The musicians on the March 7 recording session included Hal Blaine, drums; Al Casey, guitar and Larry Knechtel, bass.

The backing vocalists on the March 7 recording session and alternate version were BJ Baker, Sally Stevens, Bob Tebo, and John Bahler. Many think that The Blossoms sang background vocals on this song but that was listed on the liner notes by mistake. There was one session where alternate versions were recorded using the same vocalists.

1968 television special re-recording
It was thought Presley re-recorded the song in June 1968 for the soundtrack of his 1968 comeback special, with the intent of performing it during the program (in part due to Live a Little, Love a Little being scheduled for release about a month before the special's broadcast date). Ultimately, it was decided not to use this recording, and the song was dropped from the planned special. The newer version transposed the key of A major recording of three months earlier into E major and featured a vocal and heavy reverb with backup vocals from The Blossoms. In the mid-1990s, Joseph A. Tunzi sold this recording to Bertelsmann Music Group and it was initially included on the 1998 release Memories: The '68 Comeback Special. Tunzi had been the first to document this recording in his 1996 book Elvis Sessions II: The Recorded Music of Elvis Aron Presley 1953-1977.
After the tapes from the original session were rediscovered, it is now known to be take 2, recorded on March 7, 1968.

Charts

Junkie XL / JXL remix

Following the song's use in the 2001 film Ocean's Eleven, "A Little Less Conversation" was remixed by Dutch musician Tom Holkenborg, better known as Junkie XL (billed as JXL). The electronic remix featured Elvis with his baritone voice, and added emphasis to the 1968 guitars, horns, and a funk drum beat. Holkenborg is the first artist outside the Presley organization to receive authorization from the Presley estate to remix a Presley song. (in the 1980s, Elvis' longtime producer Felton Jarvis had overseen remixes of a number of Elvis recordings that saw new backing added to Presley's original vocals, the first of which were released as the album Guitar Man in 1981). The electronic version of the song became a number-one hit in the UK in 2002. The song also became a top 10 hit in upwards of 17 other countries, reaching number-one in 13 of them. 

In 2002, the TV special version of "A Little Less Conversation" remixed by Junkie XL was used for Nike's 2002 FIFA World Cup advertising campaign, titled "Secret Tournament". A single, credited to "Elvis vs. JXL", was issued and went on to become a number-one hit in over 20 countries.

At about the same time, a compilation of Presley's US and UK number-one chart hits, titled ELV1S: 30 No. 1 Hits, was being prepared for release. At the last minute, "A Little Less Conversation (Junkie's remix version)" was added as the album's 31st and final track, just before its release in October 2002. The full 6:09 version was edited slightly and extended to 6:22, and this version was featured on the US version of Junkie XL's 2003 album Radio JXL: A Broadcast from the Computer Hell Cabin.

The song is used for the end credits of DC's 2023 superhero movie Shazam! Fury of the Gods until a bonus scene is screened.

Chart performance
In the United States, the song peaked at number 50 on the Billboard Hot 100. It also spent four consecutive weeks at number-one on the UK Singles Chart, which is the only number-one hit by Elvis Presley to be released after his death in 1977. The song was re-released as a single in the United Kingdom in 2005, and reached No. 3.

Charts

Weekly charts

Year-end charts

Decade-end charts

Certifications

Release history

References

Elvis Presley songs
1968 singles
2002 singles
Television theme songs
Number-one singles in Australia
Canadian Singles Chart number-one singles
Number-one singles in New Zealand
Number-one singles in Denmark
Number-one singles in Hungary
Number-one singles in Switzerland
Number-one singles in Norway
Number-one singles in Scotland
Number-one singles in Sweden
UK Singles Chart number-one singles
Irish Singles Chart number-one singles
Songs written by Mac Davis
Songs written by Billy Strange
1968 songs
Songs written for films
RCA Records singles
Bertelsmann Music Group singles